This is a list of Chabad houses in the US state of California. It may not include every one.

Notes

References 

Chabad houses in California
Chabad houses
Chabad in the United States